Bostic Charge Parsonage is a historic home located at Bostic, Rutherford County, North Carolina.  It was built in 1922, and is a -story, three bay, Bungalow / American Craftsman-style brick and frame dwelling.  It features a side-gabled roof, center shed dormer, and full-width front porch.  It was built as a parsonage for a minister serving five local Methodist churches.

It was added to the National Register of Historic Places in 2012.

References

Houses on the National Register of Historic Places in North Carolina
Houses completed in 1922
Houses in Rutherford County, North Carolina
National Register of Historic Places in Rutherford County, North Carolina